Skopska Crna Gora (Macedonian and ,), often called simply Crna Gora (Macedonian and), is a mountain range and ethnographic region in North Macedonia, Kosovo and Serbia. The highest peak is Ramno  in Macedonia. The largest town on the mountain is Kučevište in North Macedonia.

Name 
Skopska Crna Gora is also known as Karadak (from earlier  – "Black Mountain"; Macedonian and), which appeared after the Ottoman conquest of the region.

Geography

In the north, it stretches from Binačka Morava to Aračinovo in the south. The relief structure is fragmented due to the rivers of the region which descend from high points and carry eroded material. Additionally, the geological composition of the region is complicated as there are new sediments in the west, Mesozoic layers in the middle and old Palaeozoic layers in the east. The most important rivers are Letnica, Golemareka, Karadak, Pasjani, Lashtica, and Llapushnica. 31% of the region consists of arable land, whereas 11% consists of pastures and meadows. Due to the lack of nutrition available, the keeping of livestock is limited. Skopska Crna Gora consists of high mountain peaks ranging from 700–1,650m.

Municipalities that lie in the region include:

Kosovo:

Kaçanik, Viti, Elez Han, Gjilan, Ranilug, Parteš, Klokot

Serbia:

Bujanovac, Preševo

North Macedonia:

Čučer-Sandevo, Lipkovo, Aračinovo, Butel, Gazi Baba

History

Middle Ages 
It is not known since when this area is called by its current name, however it was first mentioned in the 13th century when the Tsar Konstantin Tih left the villages in his endowment. The name was mentioned again in 1300, in the charter of King Milutin in the Church of Saint George in Skopje. After the Ottoman conquest of Skopje, the name was translated into Kara-Dag, which is used until this day.

Ottoman Times 
During the Ottoman period the region remained out of the reach of the regular Ottoman civil administration. The Kosovar part of the region was turned into a nahiya by the Ottomans and was named Karatonlu, while the Macedonian part was turned into a Kaza and was named Karadak. In this period many Albanian Clans (vllazni) settled in the region, thus around 8-10% of the Albanian population belonged to the Berisha tribe, while descendants of the Krasniqi tribe settled in the villages of Gošince, Slupčane, Alaševce and Runica. There are also members of the Mirdita and Sopi tribes which settled in the region.

Following Tanzimat reforms in 1839 and the sacking of local pashas, Albanians from Skopska Crna Gora and Šar, led by Dervish Cara, revolted in Aračinovo. In January 1844 the rebels captured Gostivar and Tetovo. In February 1844 the rebels attacked and captured the whole region, including the towns of Skopje, Kumanovo, Preševo, Bujanovac, Vranje and Leskovac. A National Council led by Dervish Cara was created  The revolt was ultimately suppressed by the Ottomans, led by Hayredin Pasha in the summer of 1844.

During the mid-1800s, Catholic Albanians were expelled by Ottoman authorities.

During the Albanian revolt of 1910, Albanian fighters from Skopska Crna Gora under the command of Idriz Seferi rebelled against the Ottomans and managed to defeat them in the Battle of Kaçanik. In 1912, the Albanians rebelled again and managed to capture Skopje.

Modern history 
The region became part of the Kingdom of Serbia after the First Balkan War. Following this the region became a battleground between the Serbian forces supported by Chetniks and Albanian Kachaks under Idriz Seferi and Ajet Sopi Bllata as well as the Macedonian IMRO insurgents. The region was occupied by the Kingdom of Bulgaria during the First World War and became part of the newly established Kingdom of Serbs, Croats and Slovenes after it ended.

During the Interwar period many Serb colonizers setteled in the region

After the Invasion of Yugoslavia in 1941 the region was given to the Kingdom of Bulgaria, which resulted in Albanian resistance led by Mulla Idriz Gjilani. The Karadak Uprising was later mostly quelled by Bulgaria and the Yugoslav partisan forces after the Stratsin–Kumanovo and Kosovo Operation, but low intense fighting under the command of Hasan Ali Remniku continued until 1951.

During the Yugoslav Wars, Serb separatists supported by the FR Yugoslavia sought to create a Serbian breakaway State named "Karadak republic" in the region.

From 1998 to 1999, during the Kosovo War the "Karadak Operational Zone" of the KLA (which also included large parts of the Anamorava Region) remained inactive, thus the region saw less fighting than other parts of Kosovo. But from 1999 to 2001, during the Insurgency in the Presevo Valley and the Insurgency in Macedonia the Serbian and Macedonian parts of the region became major strongholds of the Albanian separatist organizations NLA and LAPMB.

Culture
The Albanians of Skopska Crna Gora have a dialect of their own, which in itself is a north-eastern extremity of central Gheg Albanian. The dialect borders on the verge of north-eastern Gheg Albanian.

The Macedonian population of the region speaks the Skopska Crna Gora dialect of Macedonian.

The oldest Albanian school in Kosovo, which was build in 1584, is located in the region, more specifically in Stubëll near Vitia.

The oldest Mosque in the Balkans, build in 890 is located on the foothills of the Mountains, near the village Tabanovce.

Notable people

Idriz Seferi, Albanian patriot and freedom fighter
Agim Ramadani, Albanian commander of the KLA
Njazi Azemi, Albanian commander of the KLA and UÇPMB
Ismet Jashari, Albanian commander of the KLA
Xhezair Shaqiri, Albanian commander of the KLA and NLA
Kadri Breza, Albanian freedom fighter
Rashit Mustafa, Albanian commander of the KLA
Jonuz Zejnullahu, Albanian Imam and soldier of the KLA known for blowing himself up during the Battle of Koshare
Jakup Asipi, Albanian Mullah and commander of the NLA
Lutfi Haziri, Political Leader of the "ZO Karadak" of the KLA
Sulë Hotla, Albanian Ballist commander
Lavdrim Muhaxheri, Albanian ISIL commander
Toma Raspasani, Albanian Catholic priest and freedom fighter
Arif Hiqmeti Commander during the Islamic Revolt in Albania
Johan Tarčulovski, soldier and politician
Triumf Riza, Albanian policeman
Daut Dauti, Albanian lawyer and journalist
Shemsi Beqiri, Albanian kickboxer and World champion
Petar Mandzhukov, revolutionary and anarchist
Nathanael of Ohrid, cleric, writer, and revolutionary
Riza Halimi, Albanian politician
Marko Sopi, Albanian Catholic prelate
Ali Aliu, Albanian activist
Limon Staneci, Albanian politician and journalist
Xherdan Shaqiri, Swiss footballer of Albanian origin
Nijazi Ramadani, Albanian poet
Shaban Sejdiu, Macedonian-Albanian wrestler
Shqiprim Arifi, Mayor of Preševo

See also 
List of mountains in North Macedonia
Anamorava
Gollak

References and notes
Notes

References

Sources

Mountain ranges of North Macedonia
Mountain ranges of Kosovo
Mountain ranges of Serbia
Albanian ethnographic regions
Kosovo–North Macedonia border
International mountains of Europe
Rhodope mountain range
Kosovo Ethnographic Regions